GT Racing may refer to:
 GT racing, a form of circuit auto racing with automobiles that have two seats and enclosed wheels.
 GT Racing, a video game for the Super Famicom
 GT Racing: Motor Academy, a mobile racing video game published by Gameloft